The Battle of Mount Labus was a battle fought in 209 BCE between the Seleucid Empire under Antiochus the Third and the Parthians of Arsaces the Second. The battle ended in a Seleucid victory and the Parthians becoming Seleucid vassals

Background 
The region of Parthia had split off from the Seleucid Empire around 245 BC when its governor Andragoras had declared his independence following the death of Seleucid king Antiochus II and the subsequent seizure of the Seleucid capital Antioch by the Egyptians. He was soon overthrown by the Parni tribe, led by Arsaces the First, who then claimed the kingship of Parthia. The Parni would rule Parthia unopposed for 3 decades.

Prelude 
However the Seleucids ended their conflict with Egypt and the Seleucid monarch Antiochus the Great began looking to regain the lost eastern territories. In early 209 BC he entered Media and began preparing to cross a stretch of waterless desert (most likely the Sirjan salt desert), that if successfully traversed would lead him to the Parthian capital Hecatompylos. When the current Parthian king Arsaces the Second heard of this he sent men to destroy the main underground wells along the route, however these men were met by 1000 Seleucid horsemen under a commander known as Nicomedes and were dispersed. Antiochus was then able to cross the desert and arrived at Hecatompylos. Arsaces’s much smaller Parthian army retreated to find a battle site that gave them a chance of victory and Antiochus pursued them after a brief stay at Hecatompylos. The Parthians retreated into the neighbouring region of Hyrcania, which required armies to travel though narrow passes over the Alborz mountains, the major one being the pass over Mt Labus. Here the Parthians prepared to stop Antiochus

Battle 
Antiochus knew attempting to force his full army through the pass would be suicide and instead split his army into many companies who would take different smaller routes over the mountains. In front was a detachment of Cretans shields led by Polyxenidas of Rhodes and many skirmishers led by a man only known as Diogenes. The rear was brought up by mainly infantry led by Nicolaus of Aetolia and the aforementioned Nicomedes. The march proved difficult, with Antiochus’s army fighting tough weather, which caused many trees and rocks to fall and block the Seleucids way. The Parthians had also constructed blockades and positioned groups of soldiers on the different high points in the pass. This would’ve made it impossible for a purely phalanx army to make it through, however the Parthians failed to prepare for the light skirmishers led by Diogenes and this would be their downfall. Each time the Seleucids saw a group of Parthians Diogenes’s company climbed to points above the enemy and proceeded to harass and kill them until they retreated. This pattern continued for seven days as Antiochus moved up the mountain. However as the Seleucids neared the summit the Parthians had finally caught on to the tactic and instead all resolved to fight Antiochus on the summit. On the eighth the day the two forces fought each other. The battle between the infantry was a surprisingly close contest, and the Parthians may have possibly prevailed. However once again Diogenes found an alternative route across the summit and appeared behind the Parthians. This caused panic in Arsaces’s army and they routed, allowing the Seleucids to enter Hyrcania.

Aftermath 
Antiochus first took Tambrax, a large unwalled city. Most of its inhabitants fled to the walled Sirynx, which was then put under siege by Antiochus. The siege was hard fought but Antiochus’s numbers eventually allowed him to force through the defences. After the fall of Sirynx Arsaces knew all was lost and surrendered to Antiochus. Arsaces now ruled Parthia as a vassal of the Seleucid Empire. This state of affairs wouldn’t last long however, as after the Seleucid defeat against the Romans at the Battle of Magnesia they began a century long decline, which allowed the Parthians to free themselves again, and eventually conquer all of Persia to become one of the Middle East’s dominant powers.

References 

209 BC